Le Brassus is a village in the Vallée de Joux  in the Canton of Vaud, Switzerland. It is part of the municipality Le Chenit.

Transport
Le Brassus station is the western terminus of the Vallorbe–Le Brassus railway line. Trains on this line are operated by Travys.

Sports
Le Brassus hosted the second European Orienteering championships in 1964.

Horology
Le Brassus is the home of the luxury watchmakers Audemars Piguet and Blancpain.

References

Villages in the canton of Vaud